Peter Martin Fairgrieve Ramage (26 March 1908 – 17 December 1982) was a Scottish footballer who played as an inside left.

Career
Ramage began his career playing for hometown club Bonnyrigg Rose Athletic. Moves to Tranent Juniors and Newtongrange Star followed, before moving to England in 1927 to sign for Coventry City. In 1928, after scoring five times in 26 league games for Coventry, Ramage joined Derby County. At Derby, he played 233 Football League games for the club, scoring 55 times over the course of nine years. In 1937, Ramage signed for Chesterfield, playing 71 times over the course of two seasons. In 1939, Ramage signed for Chelmsford City. Due to the outbreak of World War II, he guested for Notts County and Derby County during his time at Chelmsford. Following the culmination of the war, Ramage played for non-league clubs Heanor Town, Atherstone Town, Ilkeston Town, Qualcast Sports and Brush Sports.

References

1908 births
1982 deaths
Association football wingers
Scottish footballers
Sportspeople from Midlothian
Bonnyrigg Rose Athletic F.C. players
Tranent Juniors F.C. players
Newtongrange Star F.C. players
Coventry City F.C. players
Derby County F.C. players
Chesterfield F.C. players
Chelmsford City F.C. players
Derby County F.C. wartime guest players
Notts County F.C. wartime guest players
Heanor Town F.C. players
Atherstone Town F.C. players
Ilkeston Town F.C. (1945) players
Brush Sports F.C. players
English Football League players
Scottish Junior Football Association players